Alexandros "Alekos" Monastiriotis (born 1924) was a Greek water polo player. He competed in the 1948 Summer Olympics. At club level, he played for Olympiacos.

See also
 Greece men's Olympic water polo team records and statistics
 List of men's Olympic water polo tournament goalkeepers

References

External links
 

1924 births
Date of birth missing
Possibly living people
Water polo goalkeepers
Greek male water polo players
Olympic water polo players of Greece
Water polo players at the 1948 Summer Olympics
Olympiacos Water Polo Club players
Place of birth missing